Tatyana Reshetnikova (born 14 October 1966) is a Russian former hurdler. She finished fourth in the 100 metres hurdles final at the 1995 World Championships. Her best time in the 100m hurdles of 12.53 secs on 4 July 1994 in Linz, was the fastest time in the world for that year (tied with Svetla Dimitrova).

She is married to 1988 Olympic pole vault silver medallist, Rodion Gataullin.

International competitions

References

1966 births
Living people
Russian female hurdlers
Olympic female hurdlers
Olympic athletes of Russia
Athletes (track and field) at the 1996 Summer Olympics
World Athletics Championships athletes for Russia
Russian Athletics Championships winners
Herzen University alumni